Booker Independent School District is a public school district based in Booker, Texas (USA). Located in Lipscomb County, small portions of the district extends into Hemphill County and Ochiltree County. The district operates one high school, Booker High School.

Finances
As of the 2010–2011 school year, the appraised valuation of property in the district was $252,857,000. The maintenance tax rate was $0.112 and the bond tax rate was $0.000 per $100 of appraised valuation.

Academic achievement
Between 2004 and 2011 a school district in Texas could receive one of four possible rankings from the Texas Education Agency: Exemplary (the highest possible ranking), Recognized, Academically Acceptable, and Academically Unacceptable (the lowest possible ranking). No state accountability ratings will be given to districts in 2012. As of 2013 TEA changed the ratings based on new EOC exams to Met Standard or Improvement Required.

Historical district TEA accountability ratings
2014: Met Standard 
2013: Met Standard 
2011: Recognized
2010: Academically Acceptable
2009: Academically Acceptable
2008: Academically Acceptable
2007: Academically Acceptable
2006: Academically Acceptable
2005: Academically Acceptable
2004: Academically Acceptable

Schools
In the 2011–2012 school year, the district operated two campuses.
Booker Jr/Sr School (Grades 6-12)
Kirksey Elementary (Grades PK-5)

Other information
In 2011, superintendent Michael Lee forbid an Al Jazeera TV crew from reporting at a Booker High School's football game.

See also

List of school districts in Texas
List of high schools in Texas

References

External links

School districts in Hemphill County, Texas
School districts in Lipscomb County, Texas
School districts in Ochiltree County, Texas